Dolná Seč is a village and municipality in the Levice District in the Nitra Region of Slovakia.

History
In historical records the village was first mentioned in 1310.

Geography
The village lies at an altitude of 155 metres and covers an area of 8.78 km². It has a population of about 445 people.

Ethnicity
The village is about 85% Slovak, 7% Magyar and 7% Gypsy.

Facilities
The village has a public library and a  football pitch.

Genealogical resources

The records for genealogical research are available at the state archive "Statny Archiv in Nitra, Slovakia"

 Roman Catholic church records (births/marriages/deaths): 1827-1945 (parish A)

See also
 List of municipalities and towns in Slovakia

External links
https://web.archive.org/web/20080111223415/http://www.statistics.sk/mosmis/eng/run.html
Surnames of living people in Dolna Sec

Villages and municipalities in Levice District